Sergei Nikolayevich Shestakov (born January 30, 1961, in Stavropol) is a Russian professional football coach and a former player.

He was the first foreigner to score a goal for Legia Warszawa.

His son Kirill Shestakov is a professional footballer.

External links
Profile at Footballfacts.ru

Soviet footballers
Russian footballers
Russian Premier League players
Russian expatriate footballers
Expatriate footballers in Poland
FC Salyut Belgorod players
FC Dynamo Stavropol players
Daugava Rīga players
Legia Warsaw players
FC Lada-Tolyatti players
Ekstraklasa players
Russian football managers
1961 births
Living people
Russian expatriate sportspeople in Poland
Sportspeople from Stavropol
Association football defenders